Binibining Pilipinas 1997 was the 34th edition of Binibining Pilipinas. It took place at the Araneta Coliseum in Quezon City, Metro Manila, Philippines on March 2, 1997.

At the end of the event, Aileen Damiles crowned Abbygale Williamson Arenas as Binibining Pilipinas Universe 1997, Daisy Reyes crowned Kristine Florendo as Binibining Pilipinas World 1997, and Melanie Marquez, Miss International 1979, crowned Susan Jane Juan Ritter as Binibining Pilipinas International 1997. Abiele Arianne del Moral was named First Runner-Up, while Marivic Galang was named Second Runner-Up.

Results
 
Color keys
  The contestant was a Semi-Finalist in an International pageant.
  The contestant did not place but won a Special Award in the pageant.
  The contestant did not place.

Special Awards

Contestants
30 contestants competed for the three titles.

Notes

Post-pageant Notes 

Abbygale Arenas did not place at Miss Universe 1997 in Las Vegas, Nevada. However, she was awarded as Miss Photogenic. Arenas previously won the 1992 Supermodel of the Philippines and competed at the 1992 Supermodel of the World, but was unplaced.
Kristine Florendo competed at Miss World 1997 in the Seychelles but was unplaced. On the other hand, Susan Jane Ritter competed at Miss International 1997 in Kyoto, Japan, and was one of Top 15.
Rochelle Romero Ong competed at Mutya ng Pilipinas 1998, where she was eventually crowned Mutya ng Pilpinas-Asia Pacific 1998. She competed at Miss Asia Pacific 1998 but did not place.

References

1997
1997 beauty pageants